Duncan Pritchard  is the chancellor's professor of philosophy and the director of graduate studies at the University of California, Irvine. He was previously professor of philosophy and chair in epistemology at the University of Edinburgh. His research is mainly in the field of epistemology. He has studied the problem of scepticism, the epistemic externalism/internalism distinction; the rationality of religious belief; testimony; the relationship between epistemic and content externalism; virtue epistemology; epistemic value; modal epistemology; Wittgensteinian hinge epistemology; the history of scepticism; and epistemological contextualism.

Academic studies 
He received his PhD in philosophy from the University of St Andrews.

Books 
The books of Pritchard:
Epistemology, (Palgrave Macmillan, 2016). [NB. This is the retitled second edition of Knowledge].
Epistemic Angst: Radical Skepticism and the Groundlessness of Our Believing (Princeton University Press, 2015).
What is this Thing Called Philosophy?, (editor, Routledge, 2015).
Philosophy for Everyone, (editor, with M. Chrisman, Routledge, 2013).
Epistemological Disjunctivism (Oxford University Press, 2012).
Knowledge, (Palgrave Macmillan, 1st ed. 2009). [The second edition of this textbook has been retitled Epistemology—see above].
What is this Thing Called Knowledge?, (Routledge, 1st ed. 2006; 2nd ed. 2009; 3rd ed. 2013; 4th ed. 2018).
Epistemology A-Z (with M. Blaauw), (Edinburgh UP/Palgrave Macmillan, 2005)

Awards 
He received the Philip Leverhulme Prize for his research in philosophy in 2007. He received a chair in epistemology in 2007. He was also elected to a Fellowship of the Royal Society of Edinburgh in 2011 for his works in philosophy.

References

External links
http://www.ed.ac.uk/profile/duncan-pritchard
http://www.research.ed.ac.uk/portal/en/persons/duncan-pritchard(3f3826b9-e53a-4413-850f-dd444d6ca802).html
http://www.oxfordbibliographies.com/obo/page/philosophy
http://philosophy.uconn.edu/2016/08/19/duncan-pritchard-visiting-fall-2016
http://press.princeton.edu/titles/10636.html

Scottish philosophers
Epistemologists
Living people
Academics of the University of Edinburgh
Year of birth missing (living people)